Lami F.C. is a Fijian football team playing in the second division of the Fiji Football Association competitions. It is based in Lami, which is a town situated some 10 kilometers from Suva on the island of Viti Levu.

Their uniform includes gold shirt.

History 
The Lami Soccer Association was formed in 1978, under the presidency of Johnny Singh.

Current squad
Squad for the 2018 Inter-District Championship

See also 
 Fiji Football Association

References

Bibliography 
 M. Prasad, Sixty Years of Soccer in Fiji 1938 – 1998: The Official History of the Fiji Football Association, Fiji Football Association, Suva, 1998.

Football clubs in Fiji
1978 establishments in Fiji